Zarra is a municipality in the Valencian Community, Spain, the smallest of the seven villages that make up the comarca of Valle de Cofrentes.

Historical Interest 
The name is of Iberian origin and means "the old".

The village contains a church dating back to the 18th century and a free standing clock tower built in 1880. The majority of the houses date back 400 years.

During the Moorish occupation of Spain a castle was built, but no remains exist today and the exact site is somewhat of a mystery. The village was reconquered by the Spanish in 1249 and incorporated into Valencia in 1281. Modern day Zarra dates from around 1600.

Modern Zarra 
The village has a population of around 500, recent population increases being mainly due to the British influx into the village and surrounding area.

Fiestas 
Zarra boasts three fiestas a year, marking the beginning of the fiestas within the valley. The first being San Anton (January), Santa Ana (July) and the main yearly "bull" fiesta (late July/August).

Local industry 
The main industry for the village is agriculture, in particular the growing of cherries and olives.

References

Municipalities in the Province of Valencia
Valle de Cofrentes